Ptarmigan Traverse is an alpine climbing route in the  North Cascades of Washington state. The route, from Cascade Pass to Dome Peak, is generally remote, unmarked, and challenging, traversing rugged terrain and several glaciers.

History

The first traverse took 13 days in July 1938. The group consisted of four members of the Ptarmigan Climbing Club: Bill Cox, Calder Bressler, Ray W. Clough, and Tom Myers. The second traverse was in 1953 and consisted of Dale Cole, Bob Grant, Mike Hane, Erick Karlsson and Tom Miller. Miller took high-quality photos of the peaks, valleys, glaciers, and lakes, which were later published in a book by The Mountaineers.  The book, called The North Cascades, was published in 1964 and proved instrumental in the bid to create the North Cascades National Park.

The route is named after an alpine bird, the rock ptarmigan.  The "p" is silent and is pronounced "TAR-mig-an".

The third successful traverse of the route was made in 1958 by a party led by photographer Ira Spring, with Coleman Leuthy, Ray and Marge McConnell, Peggy Stark and Russell Bockman. The trip was described in an article published in The Saturday Evening Post that was illustrated with Spring's stunning photos of the trip. Today the route is a common goal of Cascade Range mountaineers.

Route
Place names are listed from north to south:

Cascade Pass area
 Buckner Mountain – 
 Boston Peak – 
 Sahale Peak – 
 Cascade Pass –  - last improved trail
 Mixup Peak – 
 Cache Col –  - boundary between North Cascades National Park and Glacier Peak Wilderness
 Magic Mountain – 
 Pelton Peak –

Middle Cascade area

 Hurry-up Peak – 
 Middle Cascade Glacier – 
 Mount Formidable – 
 Spider Mountain –

South Cascade area

 Le Conte Mountain – 
 LeConte Glacier – 
 Sentinel Peak – 
 South Cascade Glacier –  - largest glacier on route after Chickamin Glacier on Dome Peak
 White Rock Lakes –

Dome area

 Dana Glacier – 
 Spire Point – 
 Dome Peak –

References

 Beckey, Fred, Cascade Alpine Guide Volume 2, The Mountaineers Books 
 Karlsson, Erick, "South of Cascade Pass," The Mountaineer, 1953, p. 38
 Miller, Tom, The North Cascades, The Mountaineers, 1964

Hiking trails in Washington (state)
North Cascades of Washington (state)
Landforms of Skagit County, Washington